The John B. Ragland Mercantile Company Building, also known as Raglands, is a historic building at 201 E. Kleberg Ave. in Kingsville, Texas.  It was designed by Jules Leffland and was built in 1909.  It was listed on the National Register of Historic Places in 1993.

Its design is mainly Italianate but has other architectural elements including Gothic Revival and Mission Revival.  Its two public facades are brick and limestone.

See also

National Register of Historic Places listings in Kleberg County, Texas
Recorded Texas Historic Landmarks in Kleberg County

References

Commercial buildings on the National Register of Historic Places in Texas
Italianate architecture in Texas
Commercial buildings completed in 1909
Kingsville, Texas
National Register of Historic Places in Kleberg County, Texas